Kim Hyeung-Bum (Hangul: 김형범, born January 1, 1984) is a retired South Korean footballer. He is best known for his free-kick ability.

He scored a record 11 free-kick goals in the K League Classic.

International career
Kim made his international debut in a World Cup qualification against UAE on October 15, 2008.  He assisted South Korea's fourth goal of the game. The game ended 4-1 for South Korea.

Club career statistics

Honours

 Ulsan Hyundai FC
 K League 1 (1) : 2005

 Jeonbuk Hyundai Motors
 K League 1 (2) : 2009, 2011
 AFC Champions League (1) : 2006

References

External links
 
 National Team Player Record 
 
 

1984 births
Living people
Association football midfielders
South Korean footballers
South Korea international footballers
Ulsan Hyundai FC players
Jeonbuk Hyundai Motors players
Daejeon Hana Citizen FC players
Gyeongnam FC players
K League 1 players
Konkuk University alumni
Footballers from Seoul